Nebrin (also Romanized as Nebrīn) is a village in Dizajrud-e Gharbi Rural District, in the Central District of Ajab Shir County, East Azerbaijan Province, Iran. At the 2006 census, its population was 974, in 225 families.

References 

Populated places in Ajab Shir County